Friar Juan de los Barrios y Toledo, OFM (1496 – February 12, 1569) was a Roman Catholic prelate who served as the first Archbishop of  Santafé de Bogotá of the New Kingdom of Granada, (1564–1569), 
Bishop of Santa Marta (1552–1564),
and the first Bishop of Paraguay (1547–1552).

Biography
Juan de los Barrios was born in Villa de Peloche, Spain and ordained a priest in the Order of Friars Minor. 
On July 1, 1547, Pope Paul III appointed him the first Bishop of Paraguay. 
He was consecrated by Juan Martínez Silíceo, Archbishop of Toledo. 
On April 2, 1552, he was appointed by Pope Julius III as Bishop of Santa Marta. 
On March 22, 1564, Pope Pius IV appointed him the first Archbishop of Santafé en Nueva Granada. 
He died on February 12, 1569.

While bishop, he was the principal consecrator of Juan de Simancas Simancas, Bishop of Cartagena and Pedro de Ágreda Sánchez Martín, Bishop of Coro.

See also
Catholic Church in Colombia

References

External links and additional sources
 (for Chronology of Bishops) 
 (for Chronology of Bishops)  
 (for Chronology of Bishops) 
 (for Chronology of Bishops) 
 (for Chronology of Bishops) 
 (for Chronology of Bishops) 

1496 births
1569 deaths
Bishops appointed by Pope Paul III
Bishops appointed by Pope Pius IV
Bishops appointed by Pope Julius III
Franciscan bishops
16th-century Roman Catholic bishops in New Granada
Roman Catholic bishops of Paraguay
Roman Catholic bishops of Santa Marta
Roman Catholic archbishops of Bogotá